Eric Banks may refer to:
 Eric Banks (composer) (born 1969), American composer, choral conductor, and ethnomusicologist
 Eric Banks (American football) (born 1998), American football player